Karin Larsson, née Bergöö, (3 October 1859 – 18 February 1928) was a Swedish artist and designer who collaborated with her husband, Carl Larsson, as well as being often depicted in his paintings.

Early life and education

Karin Bergöö was born in Örebro and grew up in Hallsberg, where her father, Adolf Bergöö, was a successful businessman. Her younger sister, Stina, married the English geologist Francis Arthur Bather. Karin showed early artistic talent, and after attending the Franska Skolan Ecole Française in Stockholm, studied at the Slöjdskolan (Handicrafts School; now Konstfack) and from 1877 to 1882 at the Royal Swedish Academy of Arts. After completing her studies there, she went to Grez-sur-Loing, outside Paris, where there was a colony of Scandinavian artists, to continue painting.

Life with Carl Larsson

In Grez-sur-Loing she met Carl Larsson; they fell in love and in 1883 returned to Stockholm and were married, returning together to Grez-sur-Loing, where their first child, Suzanne, was born in 1884. The following year, they returned to Sweden.

In 1888 the Larssons went to Paris, on the suggestion of Pontus Fürstenberg of Gothenburg, who wanted a large painting by Carl to add to his art collection. They left their two children with Karin's parents in Hallsberg, and upon their return a year later, decorated the Bergöös' new house. They then moved into Lilla Hyttnäs, a stuga (cottage) in Sundborn on the outskirts of Falun where her father had been born. They enlarged it to accommodate their growing family and it became known as the Larsson farm.

Karin acted as a sounding-board and critic for Carl's work, in addition to being his primary model. With children and a large house to manage, she channelled her own artistic impulses into design. She designed and wove a large amount of the textiles used in the house, embroidered, and designed clothes for herself and the children and furniture which was created by a local carpenter. For example, the pinafores worn by her and other women who worked at Sundborn, known as karinförkläde in Swedish, were a practical design by her. The style in which the house was decorated and furnished to Karin's designs, depicted in Carl's paintings, created a new, recognisably Swedish style: "In total contrast to the prevailing style of dark heavy furnishings, its bright interiors incorporated an innovative blend of Swedish folk design and fin-de-siècle influences, including Japonisme and Arts and Crafts ideas from Britain." In the "Swedish room" with which she replaced the little used drawing room, she removed curtains and placed furniture along the walls around a raised dais, creating a room within a room that was much used by the family, as shown in Carl's paintings, with a sofa in a corner for naps, shown in Lathörnet (Lazy Nook). Her textile designs and colours were also new: "Pre-modern in character they introduced a new abstract style in tapestry. Her bold compositions were executed in vibrant colours; her embroidery frequently used stylised plants. In black and white linen she reinterpreted Japanese motifs." She is buried in Sundborn cemetery.

1997, Victoria and Albert Museum in London showed her interior design at the Carl Larsson exhibition.

2009 she was highlighted with an exhibition in Sundborn.

2018, the exhibition Carl Larsson and His Home: Art of the Swedish Lifestyle at Seiji Togo Memorial Sompo Japan Nipponkoa Museum of Art, showed textiles made by Karin, and paintings of their home, made by Carl.

In popular culture
Larsson was the inspiration for Katherine Ashenburg's 2018 novel Sofie & Cecilia which is a fictionalized retelling of her life.

Paintings

References

Further reading
Axel Frieberg. Karin. En bok om Carl Larssons hustru. Stockholm: Bonnier, 1967. 
Ingrid Andersson. Karin Larsson: Konstnär och konstnärshustru. Stockholm: Gidlunds, 1986. 
Ingrid Zakrisson. 
Michael Snodin and Elisabet Stavenow-Hidemark. Carl and Karin Larsson: Creators of the Swedish Style. Exhibition catalogue. London: V & A, 1997.

External links 

 Föreningen Karin Bergöö Larssons vänner

1859 births
1928 deaths
People from Örebro
20th-century Swedish women artists
20th-century Swedish painters
19th-century Swedish women artists
19th-century Swedish painters
Swedish embroiderers